DZVA (106.3 FM), on-air as Radyo Natin 106.3, is a radio station owned and operated by Manila Broadcasting Company. Its studio is located at the 3rd Floor, SQA Bldg., Crossing, Brgy. Uno, Calamba, Laguna, and its transmitter is located at Brgy. Bagumbayan, Santa Cruz, Laguna.

Awards
 Best Media Partner for Radio - Balikat ng Bayan Awards (2017)

References

Radio stations in Laguna (province)
Radyo Natin Network stations
Radio stations established in 2002
2002 establishments in the Philippines